Surrey Public Library, operating as Surrey Libraries, is the municipal public library system of Surrey, British Columbia, Canada. Surrey Libraries serves Surrey's population of approximately 580,000 with a collection of more than 790,000 items and 188,691 active cardholders.

Services
Surrey Public Library has services and programs for patrons of all ages.

Literacy-based programs for children, youth, and adults
Information and reference services
Access to online products and a large collection of streaming/downloadable eBooks, eAudiobooks and movies.
Community information
Wi-Fi, internet & computer access
Reader's advisory services
Delivery to homebound individuals
Interlibrary loans
Downloadable eBooks and audiobooks

History
Prior to 1983, Surrey was a member of the Fraser Valley Regional Library. In 1982, Surrey held a referendum on the withdrawal from FVRL, which passed. On March 17, 1983, Surrey began operating as an independent municipal library. The Surrey Public Library's 10-branch network includes the Newton branch, designed by Patkau Architects, which was awarded the Governor General's Award for architecture in 1994. The Semiahmoo branch, which opened in 2004, was the first LEED certified public library in Canada. City Centre Library was designed by Bing Thom Architects. The library is 77,000 square feet on four floors and it is a LEED certified green building. The official Grand Opening was held on September 24, 2011.

Locations

The library has ten branches:
City Centre (LEED Gold Certified)
Clayton
Cloverdale
Fleetwood
Guildford
Newton
Ocean Park
Port Kells
Semiahmoo (LEED Silver Certified)
Strawberry Hill

Collections

 Surrey Libraries provides patrons with books, music CDs, books on CD, databases, DVDs, magazines, reference books, newspapers and online materials. Library material is available in Arabic, Chinese, Dutch, French, German, Hindi, Japanese, Korean, Persian, Punjabi, Polish, Russian, Spanish, Tagalog, Urdu, and Vietnamese. The online learning collection includes a large collection of streaming/downloadable eBooks, eAudio and movies.
 Accessibility Services offers home delivery services and specialized collections including downloadable eBooks and eAudio to Surrey patrons with print and other disabilities.
 Genealogy services are offered through the Family History Department which holds the largest collection of Canadian genealogy resources in Western Canada and offers numerous programs on genealogy.

Awards

2023 Library Board 

 Surinder Bhogal (Chief Librarian & Secretary of Board)
 Marilyn Herrmann (Chair)
 Pardeep Kooner (Council Representative)
 Dr. Balbir Gurm (Vice Chair)
 Kiran Dhesa
 Louise Hearty
 Darius Maze
 John Gillies
 Dulce Amba Cuenca
 Rachel Smith
 Gordon Powell
 Dupinder Kaur Saran
 Lisa Werring

References

External links
Official site

Public libraries in British Columbia
Surrey, British Columbia
Libraries established in 1983
1983 establishments in British Columbia